Corneilla-la-Rivière is a commune in the Pyrénées-Orientales department in southern France.

Geography

Localisation 
Corneilla-la-Rivière is located in the canton of La Vallée de la Têt and in the arrondissement of Perpignan.

Population

See also
Communes of the Pyrénées-Orientales department

References

Communes of Pyrénées-Orientales